San Martín de Porres  is a Peruvian football club, playing in the city of Pucallpa, Ucayali, Peru.

The club were founded 1964 and play in the Copa Perú which is the third division of the Peruvian league.

History
The club have played at the highest level of Peruvian football on two occasions, from 1989 Torneo Descentralizado until 1990 Torneo Descentralizado when was relegated.

In the 1998 Copa Perú, the club classified to the Regional Stage, but was eliminated.

Honours

National
Liga Departamental de Ucayali: 3
Winners (3): 1996, 1997, 1998

See also
List of football clubs in Peru
Peruvian football league system

External links
 Sin Paradero: El Primer Santo

Football clubs in Peru
Association football clubs established in 1964